The Argentina–Chile border is the longest international border of South America and the third longest in the world after the Canada–United States border and the Kazakhstan–Russia border. However, there are some border disputes, particularly around the Southern Patagonian Ice Field. It is the largest border of the two countries, beating the Argentina–Paraguay and Chile–Bolivia, Argentina's and Chile's second largest borders, respectively.

Plot 

The northern end of the border is a tripoint it forms with those at the Argentina–Bolivia border and the Bolivia-Chile border in the arid Puna de Atacama plateau. The border extends south until reaching the sea at the same place the Strait of Magellan meets the Atlantic Ocean. Further south the border on the Isla Grande de Tierra del Fuego follows a meridian separating the island into two. This boundary reaches the sea at Beagle Channel a few kilometers southwest of Ushuaia.

In November 1984 the southern border area was finally established  after long negotiations and mediation of John Paul II by the Treaty of Peace and Friendship of 1984 between Chile and Argentina, a perpetual treaty, signed at the Vatican by representatives of both countries.

On 16 December 1998, an agreement between Argentina and Chile was signed to set the border line from Mount Fitz Roy and Mount Daudet and finish with the historical dispute. However both countries didn't agree in the section between Mount Fitz Roy and Mount Murallón, and the border is still pending to be defined.

See also 
 Beagle Conflict,  a border dispute between Chile and Argentina over the possession of Picton, Lennox, and Nueva islands and the scope of the maritime jurisdiction associated with those islands that brought the countries to the brink of war in 1978.
Boundary Treaty of 1881, a treaty signed on July 23, 1881, by  Bernardo de Irigoyen and  Francisco de Borja Echeverría, which sought to clarify the existing Chile-Argentina border and establish a definite border between the two countries.
Patagonia
Argentine Chileans
Chilean Argentines
Mapuche
Culture of Argentina
Culture of Chile
Argentina national football team
Chile national football team
Anti-Chilean sentiment

References

External links 
  " Y Cronología REFERENCIAS GENERAL SOBRE LOS Acuerdos Y Tratados bordering SUSCRITOS POR ARGENTINA Y CHILE (1820-1998) '" on the site  soberaniachile.cl '
 '' The Argentine-Chilean border '" on the site' 'persee.fr'

 
Borders of Argentina
Borders of Chile
International borders